are the tools and utensils used in , the art of Japanese tea.

Tea utensils can be divided into five major categories:

 
 
 
 
 

Generally, items which guests prepare themselves with for attending a  gathering are not considered ; rather, the term fundamentally applies to items involved to "host" a  gathering.

High-end utensils are cherished, well preserved and documented and serve as historical artifacts.

These utensils are typically ceramic.

Boxes
In Japan, cherished items are customarily stored in purpose-made wooden boxes. Valuable items for tea ceremony are usually stored in such a box, and in some cases, if the item has a long and distinguished history, several layers of boxes: an inner storage box, middle storage box, and outer storage box.

are special lidded boxes containing the tea bowl, tea caddy, tea scoop and other equipment. They constitute portable tea-making sets for travel and making tea outdoors, and are available in many styles.

The " model", made of plain paulownia wood, comes in a large size and a small size.

Originally, there were no rules for the tea-making procedure. However, the 11th-generation head of the Urasenke school of tea created certain types of procedures. For the procedures, the box is carried into the place where the tea is to be made, sometimes on a tray, and the ceremony proceeds with each item being removed from, and finally returned to, the box.

Tea boxes are made of wood, and may be lacquered and decorated, or left untreated. There are similar portable tea-making sets called , in which case the box is formed through basket weaving.

Charcoal-related items

Ash

In tea ceremony, ash serves as a protective bed for the charcoal fire. Great care is given to the quality and appearance of the ash, and there are different kinds of ash for different purposes. They include the following:

It is a beautiful, smooth white ash produced by burning wisteria bean pods.
  – a dry ash specially prepared to have a smooth texture free from visible impurities. This is the main kind of ash used in portable braziers.
  – produced by burning the shells of water caltrops. It is a smooth reddish-brown ash mainly used in the container for the lighter fire in the smoking set.
  – the slightly damp ash used in the sunken hearth.
  – sticks of roasted straw. The black  is neatly arranged on top of the ash in the brazier.

Ash container
 is a shallow bowl used by the host to carry the ash into the tea room for the charcoal-laying procedure. It carries the "sprinkling ash" for the procedure in the case of a portable brazier, and the "moist ash" for the procedure in the case of a sunken hearth. The styles for these are different.

Ash spoon
The  is a spatula-like implement mainly used to shape the ash in the portable brazier, or to sprinkle ash during the charcoal-laying procedure.

Charcoal
The long pieces of finished charcoal are cut into specific lengths for use; the lengths differing depending upon whether the charcoal will be used in a brazier or sunken hearth.

It is produced by charring twigs of azalea, camellia, or some variety of oak, and then coating them with a lime substance made of powdered seashells.

Charcoal container
The  is the container in which the host places the charcoal and charcoal-laying implements for transporting them to and from the tea room for the charcoal-laying procedure. Many  are made of basketry.

Charcoal carrier

 is a charcoal container used in the preparation room, and not considered a formal piece of equipment. It is brought into the tea room if the charcoal in the portable brazier or sunken hearth requires replenishing. It is box-shaped, has a handle, and is made of wood—usually mulberry wood.

Charcoal starter

Feather brooms
 is a feather broom with a number of styles. It is part of the set of equipment carried into the tea room with the charcoal container. Other kinds of feather brooms are used for sweeping the tea room.

are metal chopsticks used to handle charcoal.

Incense container

 is a small lidded container for the incense that is added to the charcoal fire during the charcoal-laying procedure. For the kneaded incense that is used in a sunken hearth, the container is generally made of ceramic. For the chips of incense wood used in a portable brazier, it is generally made of lacquer ware or plain wood. There are also incense containers made of clam shells.

Cloth items

A  is a small rectangular white linen or hemp cloth mainly used to wipe the tea bowl. There are two main sizes: large and small. The raw edges on the lengthwise sides have a narrow rolled hem finished with overlock stitching. These two hems face opposite sides of the cloth.

It is used by Omotesenke practitioners in the same way as the : the host and the guests each carry one, which is kept in the breast of the kimono. It is sometimes used by guests to protect the tea implements whilst examining them, and the host will put one out with the tea bowl when serving thick tea.

A  is a double layer silk cloth approximately  square, with a fold on one edge and the other three edges sewn together so the stitching is invisible. It is used for the symbolic cleansing of the tea scoop and tea caddy, and (usually by women) to handle hot kettle or pot lids.

By tradition, the host of a formal tea ceremony uses a new, previously unused .  are most often monochromatic and unpatterned, but variations exist. There are different colours for men (usually purple) and women (orange or red), for people of different ages or skill levels, for different ceremonies and for different schools. The size and way of making  was purportedly established by Sen Sōon, Sen no Rikyū's second wife.

are rectangular wallets in many cases shaped like a traditional envelope, with a flap that closes the wallet. There are two sizes of  corresponding to the two sizes of  paper: a smaller one for women, and a larger one for men. Men's  are generally less ornate and brightly coloured than women's, but this is not always the case.

In the Urasenke school, both the host and guests each carry one. If wearing kimono, it is kept in the breast of the kimono. Guests not wearing kimono might carry it in their . The  is sometimes used by guests to protect the tea implements whilst examining them. Depending on the circumstances, the host may put one out with the tea.

refers to a variety of bags used for storing  and other tea implements. They are traditionally made from silk, and are often patterned or brocaded. Extremely precious implements were often held in bags made out of rare old Chinese brocades.  are secured with a  silk cord, which is tied in prescribed ways.

Furniture

The  is the original portable shelf unit used in the Japanese tea ceremony. The most orthodox style is the formal , finished in highly polished black lacquer. The lower board rests on the tatami, and there are four posts at the corners of this, supporting a shelf.

A  is a wooden board, usually lacquered, on which the main tea implements may be displayed in the tea room.

is the term for the various kinds of boards on which the portable brazier may be arranged in the tea room. They are classified by shape as large, half-size, small, or round. They are wooden, and may be finished with lacquer and/or decorated in various other manners. There are rules for what kind of board to use with what kind of brazier.

, literally "shelf/shelves," is a generic term for various types of shelving used in the tea ceremonies and placed on the host's mat. Each type of  has its own name. The latter, are basically categorized as either large shelf units or small shelf units.

 are made of various types of wood, the most formal style finished in highly polished black lacquer. Some  include drawers or shelves enclosed by sliding doors. Tea utensils may be placed onto/into the  before the start of a ceremony and/or at the end.  are used only tea rooms of 4.5 tatami mats or larger.

Hearths

are relatively small portable braziers used to heat the kind of iron hot-water kettle called , which has a spout and handle across the top.

are portable braziers used in the tea room to heat the hot water kettle to make the tea. They are commonly made of ceramic or metal, although there are rare examples of wooden  as well.

are fire pits built into the floor of tea rooms and used in the cold season, for heating the hot water kettle to make the tea. The frame that fits around it at the top is called , and usually is of lacquered wood.

An  is a portable  that is set on the floor and is used in circumstances when the room does not have a  that can be used.

-related items

or 
They are made of iron, tin or pottery.

literally meaning "hanging", refers to a painting or calligraphic work mounted on paper or textile, for hanging in the  alcove. The  is the centerpiece of the tea room.

is a term used for refined quality tea implements, mainly ceramics, produced in China particularly in the Song Dynasty, Yuan Dynasty, and Ming Dynasty, which when imported to Japan were selected for their excellence and have been highly valued in Japan ever since. See also , .

is a term for tea utensils produced in the Korean Peninsula mainly during the Yi dynasty of Korea, occasionally compared with the above-mentioned . See

are ceramics made in Japan. More specifically, the term means "provincial ceramics," and does not include Kyoto-ware or Seto-ware ceramics.

Miscellaneous items

A  is a relatively small bowl, usually made of copper, used for rinsing and washing .

A  is a shaper for bamboo whisks.  are made from wood or ceramic; a wet whisk is placed on the shaper and allowed to dry, restoring its shape. This item is used in the  back room, and is not seen in the tea room.

Folding fan
 (also known as ) are carried by all participants in a  ceremony as a sign of respect. It is not opened and used for fanning. The fan, in its closed state, is placed in front of oneself when making formal statements or expressions of thanks, respect, apology, and such. During the main portions of a tea ceremony in which they are seated on the floor, guests place their fans on the floor directly behind themselves for instant use when required.

If the circumstance involves being seated on the floor, the closed fan is placed on the floor in front of the knees, leaving enough space in between to place the hands for the attendant bow. If the circumstance involves being in a standing position, the closed fan is held in the right hand, against the front of the right thigh, paired with the left hand which is held against the front of the left thigh, for the standing bow.

are for resting the lid of the kettle on, and also for resting the water ladle on. They are made of bamboo, ceramic, or metal. There are many styles.

There is a group of seven kinds of  lid rests that are attributed to Sen no Rikyu. They are:
  (censer)
  (five virtues tripod)
  (iddle person at well)
 
  (turban shell)
  (crab)
  (tree leaves)

is a metal tripod on which the kettle is set.

Flowers, together with their containers, are an important element of the decorations for the tea ceremony. Basketry  usually are reserved for use in the warm season, when the  will consist of an assortment of seasonal grassy flowers.

Incense

is white paper used for miscellaneous purposes. It is usually in the form of a pad of paper folded in half. The name indicates that it is paper kept handy in the bosom overlap of the kimono.

means "kettle mat". Ones of woven material are called . Ones consisting of a special thick pad of paper are called . There are also ones of bamboo, called , which are for use in the preparation room.



is the term for the rinse-water receptacle used by the host in the tea room. Usually made of metal or ceramic, though there are some made of lacquered bentwood. Water that has been used to rinse the tea bowl is emptied into it. It is kept out of sight of the guests as much as possible, being the last item brought into the tea room, and the first item removed.

is a tube or vessel used to store a  cloth.

Screens

  (sometimes shortened to ). A relatively low folding screen of two panels, which is set in the corner at the head end of the tea-making tatami in cases when the tea-making is done in a room larger than 4.5 tatami in floor space.
 . A low fence-like device set at the head end of the tea-making tatami in cases when the tea-making is done in a room larger than 4.5 tatami in floor space or in an open area such as outdoors.

Pots

are pots, usually made of iron, in which the water used to make tea is heated.

are iron pots having a pouring spout and handle that crosses over the top. They are used for heating and pouring the hot water during certain tea ceremonies.

is a generic term for tea utensils produced outside Japan, Korea and China.
 : items from the Philippines (Luzon)
 : items from Vietnam
 : items from Southeast Asia
 : a type of simple unglazed ware from Southeast Asia
 : a style of lacquer ware that entered Japan from Thailand
 : an alloy of copper, lead, and tin. Some  items entered Japan from Southeast Asia.

Smoking equipment
 , the tray or box for the smoking set that the host provides the guests in the waiting room, at the waiting arbor, and in the tea room at the time of the "thin tea" service.
 , a container for the lit charcoal that serves as the lighter. Usually made of ceramic. The  holds this .
 , a bamboo tube that serves as the ash receptacle. The  holds this .
 , a long-stemmed smoking pipe.

Sweet-related items

, the "main sweet", is served before . How many are used would depend on the number of guests at the tea ceremony.

There are two common types: a shorter metal style, and a longer wooden style called  after the type of tree they are traditionally made from.

Tea bowls

 are bowls used for making and drinking  tea. They can be classified by country of origin, by potter or kiln, by shape, or by the type of tea they are designed to hold.

Tea containers

All tea containers for  may be called .  usually are of lacquered or plain wood, although not necessarily so.

The  ones are classified by potter, region, or kiln. All are also classified according to shape.

Tea scoops

; also called tea spoon(s), are used to transfer the powdered tea from the tea container to the tea bowl.

Typically, tea scoops are made of a narrow, thin piece of bamboo, although there are also those made of wood or ivory. The original ones imported to Japan from China were ivory. Tea masters in Japan have traditionally carved their own bamboo , providing them with a bamboo storage tube as well as a poetic name that will often be inscribed on the storage tube.

Trays
Various styles of trays are used in tea ceremony, including:
 , a round black-lacquered tray with mother-of-pearl inlay of the eight Chinese divination symbols.
 , a round tray having undulating rim like a mountain path.
 .

means "Japanese item"; an article produced in Japan.

Water containers

A  is a lidded container for fresh cold water used by the host in the tea room during ceremonies.

Often, a ceramic  will have a custom-made lid made of lacquered wood, especially if it is a container originally lacking a matching lid.

The  is one of the main objects in the aesthetic scheme of the objects the host selects for the particular occasion.  are classified by their shape, place of make, and other characteristics.

A  is a lidded water pitcher used to replenish the vessel for fresh water at the end of certain ceremonies.

There are ones of metal, ones of ceramic, and ones of bentwood.

Water ladles

 is a long bamboo ladle with a nodule in the approximate center of the handle. It is used to pour hot water into the tea bowl from the iron pot and to transfer cold water from the fresh water container to the iron pot when required.

Different styles are used for different ceremonies and in different seasons.

Whisks

 are bamboo whisks used to prepare matcha. They are hand-carved from a single piece of bamboo. There are differences in their style according to the type of bamboo they are made from, the shape of the tines, the number of tines, the thickness of the bamboo, the length of the bamboo, the color of the thread that is woven around the bottom of the tines, and so on.

Different schools of  prefer different styles and employ different styles depending on the particular kind of tea or tea-preparation style for which it is to be used. For instance, there are specific styles for preparing thin tea, thick tea, tea offerings in  tea bowls, tea in tall cylindrical tea bowls, for including in a portable boxed tea set, for outdoor tea-making, for New Year's, and for other special auspicious occasions.

See also

 History of tea in Japan
 
 Japanese kitchen

References

 Michiko, Suganuma. "Lacquer teaware".

Further reading

External links